During the 2004–05 Spanish football season, Deportivo de La Coruña competed in La Liga.

Season summary
Deportivo suffered a slump and finished eighth. The club also suffered poor form in the Champions League, finishing bottom of their group with only two points and no goals scored. This was a stark contrast to the form the club had shown in Europe the previous season when they reached the Champions League semi-finals.

Kit
Deportivo's kit was manufactured by Joma and sponsored by Fadesa.

Squad
Squad at end of season

Left club during season

Competitions

La Liga

League table

UEFA Champions League

Third qualifying round

Group stage

References

Deportivo de La Coruna
Deportivo de La Coruña seasons